Girivassipura is a 2018 Sri Lankan Sinhala-language historical drama film written and directed by Devinda Kongahage. The film stars Pubudu Chathuranga and Niranjani Shanmugaraja in the main lead roles while Mahendra Perera, Amiththa Weerasinghe and Buddika Lokukatiya play pivotal roles.

Production
The film is based on the real-life story of the former Sri Lankan king, Sri Vikrama Rajasinha of Kandy who was also the last domestic ruler (king) to have ruled the Kingdom of Kandy before the ruling of British authorities.  The film was made with a whopping budget of 13 Crores as the film went onto become one of the most expensive Sinhala film as well as Sri Lankan film ever to be made in the history of Cinema of Sri Lanka. The film roped in Bibiladeniye Mahanama Thero as music composer for the film which in fact was the first instance where a Buddhist monk was roped in to score music for the film. The lyrics for the songs were penned by Pottuvil Asmin  and this film also became the first Sinhala film to feature a Tamil song.

The film had its theatrical release on 13 October 2018 with English and Tamil subtitles clashing alongside biographical film Nidahase Piya DS at the box office.

The portions of the film were shot in Colombo, Kandy and Hingurangketha with the shooting of the film went on floors from late 2017. The film is produced by Best Life Cinema which is also their second production in Sinhala film industry.

Cast 

 Pubudu Chathuranga as Sri Vikrama Rajasinha
 Niranjani Shanmugaraja as Queen Ranganayaki
 Mahendra Perera as Pilimathalawa
 Buddika Lokukatiya
 Amiththa Weerasinghe
 Daya Thennakoon
 Nayanthara Wickramarachchi
 Kingsly Lose
 Somaweera Gamage
 Roshan Pilapitiya
 Elroy Amalathas
 Wilmon Sirimanne
 Dayasiri Hettiarachchi
 Kumudu Nishantha
 Malendra Weeraratne
 Pavithra Wickramasinghe
 Lakshan Waththuhewa
 Richard Mundy

Synopsis 
The Senkadagala tragedy which is referred as the humiliation caused to King Sri Vikrama Rajasinha by the Kandy people due to the ignition of British authorities. The plot of the film depicts the actual qualities and life story of the King and the consequences that he face due to his change in behaviours due to the mastermind plans of the British authorities whose concern was to capture the country.

See also 

 List of Sri Lankan films of the 2010s

References

External links 

 

2010s Sinhala-language films
Films based on actual events
Films shot in Sri Lanka